A parodos (also parode and parodus; , 'entrance', plural ), in the theater of ancient Greece, is a side-entrance to the stage, or the first song that is sung by the chorus at the beginning of a Greek tragedy.

Side-entrance to the theater
The parodos is a large passageway affording access either to the stage (for actors) or to the orchestra (for the chorus) of the ancient Greek theater. The term  ('way in') is also used. Scholars note that  was an older term for the passageway while parodos was widely used by writers from Aristotle onwards.

Entrance song of the chorus
Parodos also refers to the ode sung by the chorus as it enters and occupies its place in the orchestra. Aristotle defined it as "the first whole utterance of a chorus". Usually the first choral song of the drama, the parodos typically follows the play's prologue. It is an important part as it defined the chorus, provide information about the plot, and assist or fight the protagonist. In Greek comedy, the parodos is considered the climactic moment. The parodos is highly commemorated in Athenian artifacts that show choral performance.

References

 

Ancient Greek theatre